Polar is a town in Langlade County, Wisconsin, United States. The population was 984 at the 2010 census.

Geography
The town of Polar is in southern Langlade County, partly bordered to the south by Menominee County.

Demographics
As of the census of 2000, there were 995 people, 354 households, and 281 families residing in the town. The population density was 28.0 people per square mile (10.8/km2). There were 383 housing units at an average density of 10.8 per square mile (4.2/km2). The racial makeup of the town was 98.49% White, 0.10% African American, 0.40% Native American, 0.10% Asian, 0.20% from other races, and 0.70% from two or more races. Hispanic or Latino of any race were 0.30% of the population.

There were 354 households, out of which 38.4% had children under the age of 18 living with them, 68.1% were married couples living together, 6.5% had a female householder with no husband present, and 20.6% were non-families. 17.8% of all households were made up of individuals, and 7.3% had someone living alone who was 65 years of age or older. The average household size was 2.81 and the average family size was 3.17.

In the town, the population was spread out, with 29.9% under the age of 18, 5.3% from 18 to 24, 29.9% from 25 to 44, 22.4% from 45 to 64, and 12.4% who were 65 years of age or older. The median age was 37 years. For every 100 females, there were 102.2 males. For every 100 females age 18 and over, there were 106.2 males.

The median income for a household in the town was $41,477, and the median income for a family was $48,083. Males had a median income of $31,625 versus $22,059 for females. The per capita income for the town was $17,141. About 3.7% of families and 7.0% of the population were below the poverty line, including 11.0% of those under age 18 and 6.0% of those age 65 or over.

Notable people

 Edward Nordman, Wisconsin state representative and farmer, lived in the town

References

Towns in Langlade County, Wisconsin
Towns in Wisconsin